The 7th government of Turkey (5 May 1931 – 1 March 1935) was a government in the history of Turkey. It is also called the sixth İnönü government.

Background 
Following the elections held on 4 May 1931, the former cabinet led by İsmet İnönü of the Republican People's Party ended. İsmet İnönü founded the new cabinet.

The government
In the list below, the  cabinet members who served only a part of the cabinet's lifespan are shown in the column "Notes".

Aftermath
The government ended after the elections held on 8 February 1935.

References

07
Republican People's Party (Turkey) politicians
1931 establishments in Turkey
1935 disestablishments in Turkey
Cabinets established in 1931
Cabinets disestablished in 1935
Members of the 7th government of Turkey
4th parliament of Turkey
Republican People's Party (Turkey)